Berserk! is a 1967 British horror-thriller film starring Joan Crawford, Ty Hardin, Diana Dors and Judy Geeson in a macabre mother-daughter tale about a circus plagued with murders. The screenplay was written by Herman Cohen and Aben Kandel, and the film directed by Jim O'Connolly. Berserk! marks Crawford's penultimate big-screen appearance.

Plot
Monica Rivers (Joan Crawford) and Dorando (Michael Gough) co-own a travelling English circus. Monica acts as ringmistress and Dorando her business manager. When tightrope walker Gaspar the Great is strangled when his tightrope breaks, it appears that his rope might have been purposely weakened and police initiate an investigation, discovering no perpetrator. Monica's unemotional reaction to the tragedy alarms Dorando. When she suggests Gaspar's death will be good publicity, he asks her to buy him out, which she is unable to do. Monica hires a new tightrope walker, Frank Hawkins (Ty Hardin). Not only is he handsome, but he is also daring, performing his act over a carpet of sharp bayonets. Monica is impressed, especially by his physique. Meanwhile, Monica's business partner, Dorando, is found gruesomely murdered. Suspicion of Monica's guilt grows among members of the circus troupe. Hawkins in particular suspects her, having seen her leaving Dorando's trailer shortly before the body was discovered. He confronts Monica, demanding a share in the circus for his silence.

After a series of successful performances by the circus throughout the UK, Monica's daughter, Angela (Judy Geeson), having been expelled from school, shows up at the circus. Not knowing what to do with her unruly daughter, Monica pairs her with Gustavo the knife thrower (Peter Burton). Another member of the circus company, Matilda (Diana Dors), unsuccessfully attempts to seduce Hawkins, which Monica discovers. During Matilda's act, a magician's trick involving the illusion of being sawn in half, there is a malfunction in the equipment and she is killed. A few evenings later, during his high-wire performance, Frank is hit in the back with a knife, falls from his tightrope onto the bayonets and is killed. Angela is spotted throwing a knife into him before his fatal fall. She confesses, and she also reveals her motive: she has inwardly resented her mother's ignoring her and being absent from her life, thus, the murders were acts of "removing" those who took up her mother's time and attention. She then tries to kill her mother, but is stopped. Then, while trying to escape capture, she is electrocuted by an exposed wire outside the circus tent during a rainstorm. The film ends as Monica sobs inconsolably over her daughter's body.

Cast

 Joan Crawford as Monica Rivers
 Ty Hardin as Frank Hawkins
 Diana Dors as Matilda
 Michael Gough as Albert Dorando
 Judy Geeson as Angela Rivers
 Robert Hardy as Detective Supt. Brooks
 Geoffrey Keen as Commissioner Dalby
 Sydney Tafler as Harrison Liston
 George Claydon as Bruno Fontana
 Philip Madoc as Lazlo
 Ambrosine Phillpotts as Miss Burrows
 Thomas Cimarro as Gaspar
 Peter Burton as Gustavo
 Golda Casimir as Bearded Lady
 Ted Lune as Skeleton Man
 Milton Reid as Strong Man
 Marianne Stone as Wanda
 Miki Iveria as Gypsy Fortune-Teller
 Howard Goorney as Emil
 Reginald Marsh as Sergeant Hutchins
 Bryan Pringle as Constable Bradford

Production
The film was originally called Circus of Blood. It was the first of a new deal Herman Cohen had with Columbia. In August 1966 Joan Crawford signed to star, with filming to start in October in London. Cohen says the script was written with Crawford in mind.

Crawford described her role in the film as "mistress of the ceremonies, lock stock and barrel. She's colorful, she's exciting, she's the most definite dame I've ever played. She knows what she wants and she gets it."

Herman Cohen wanted to cast Christina Crawford in support of her mother Joan, but Joan vetoed the idea. Judy Geeson played the role instead. Diana Dors had a key support role.

Crawford says the filmmakers wanted to call the movie Circus of Blood or Circus of Fear but she pushed for Berserk! "and I got my way in the end". The title was changed in April 1967.

Release

Box office
Box office receipts for Berserk! were considerable. In North America, the film grossed more than $1,100,000 and ranked #85 on Varietys list of top money makers of 1968. Box office receipts overseas nearly doubled that amount, coming in at $2,095,000. This made Berserk! the most successful film that Herman Cohen ever produced.

Critical reception
Howard Thompson gave the film a mostly negative review in The New York Times, comparing it unfavorably to Circus of Horrors, but also commented, "It's also hard to make a hopeless movie with a circus background and sawdust aroma. This is the one solid thing the picture has going for it — the intriguing workaday routine of circus folk and some good, spangly ring acts, all handsomely conveyed in excellent color photography. And under the reasonable direction of Jim O'Connolly, the film does project a kind of defiant suspense that dares you not to sit there, see who gets it next and, finally, why." He goes on to state that Crawford "...is professional as usual and certainly the shapeliest ringmaster ever to handle a ring microphone."

Frank Leyendecker in Greater Amusements wrote, "Joan Crawford gives authority and extreme conviction to the colorful role of a circus owner and ringmaster...she consistently rises above the highly melodramatic, yet exploitable, material."

Lawrence Quirk wrote in Hollywood Screen Parade, "[Crawford] is all over the picture, radiant, forceful, authoritative, a genuine movie star whose appeal never diminishes."

Home media
Berserk! was released on Region 1 DVD on 6 September 2011 from the Columbia Classics DVD Collection. This is a Manufacture-on-Demand (MOD) release, available online through Warner Archive Collection and ClassicFlix and only in the U.S.

Mill Creek Entertainment released the film along with Strait-Jacket on a double feature Blu-ray on 2 October 2018.

References

External links
 
 
 
 
 Review at TVGuide.com
 Berserk! movie stills
 Berserk! at the Joan Crawford website

1967 films
1967 horror films
1960s slasher films
1960s horror thriller films
British horror thriller films
Circus films
Films directed by Jim O'Connolly
Films scored by John Scott (composer)
Columbia Pictures films
British slasher films
Psycho-biddy films
1960s English-language films
1960s British films